Petrarch or Francesco Petrarca (1304-1374) was an Italian scholar, poet, and Renaissance humanist.

Petrarca may also refer to:
 12722 Petrarca, a minor planet
 Petrarca Rugby, an Italian rugby union club

People with the surname
 David Petrarca (born 1965), American director and producer
 Lorenzo Petrarca (born 1997), Italian motorcycle racer
 Joseph Petrarca Jr. (born 1961), American politician
 Joseph Petrarca Sr. (1928–1995), American politician
 Frank J. Petrarca (1918-1943), U.S. soldier and recipient of the Medal of Honor